Stereocaulon grande is a species of snow lichen belonging to the family Stereocaulaceae.

Ecology
Stereocaulon grande is a known host to the lichenicolous fungus species:

 Catillaria stereocaulorum
 Endococcus nanellus
 Polycoccum trypethelioides

References

Stereocaulaceae
Lichen species
Taxa named by Adolf Hugo Magnusson
Lichens described in 1927